The second season of the Albanian reality talent show The Voice Kids Albania began airing on January 19, 2018 and ended on April 20, 2018, being broadcast on a weekly basis on Top Channel.

Miriam Cani,  Aleksandër & Renis Gjoka and Eneda Tarifa were the new coaches replacing all coaches from the first season. Ledion Liço was the new host and Dojna Mema was the V-Reporter and she hosted in the live shows the V-Room in YouTube and Facebook. The Vocal Coaches were Kamela Islamaj (Team Miriam), Genti Myftaraj (Team Gjoka) and Kejsi Tola (Team Eneda).

Denis Bonjaku from Team Miriam won this season and he earned a scholarship at the gymnasium New York High School of Tirana and one Weekend in Gardaland with his family.

Format
The age limit in this series being 6–14 years old.

Pre-Auditions

The show began staging producers' audition days in September–October 2017 across the Albania and Kosovo.

Episodes

Epilogue
Epilogue (Epilog) is a reunion show that aired one week after the Final of The Voice Kids Albania 2 on April 27, 2018 on Top Channel. The host was Dojna Mema.

Teams

Colour key:

Blind auditions
The open auditions application for the second series closed in September 2017, with the age limit being 6–14 years old. The show began staging producers' audition days in September–October 2017 across the Albania, with the blind auditions beginning filming on December 8, 2017 and ended on December 27, 2017 in studio of Top Channel in Tirana.

Each coach has the length of the artists' performance to decide if they want that artist on their team. Should two or more coaches want the same artist, then the artist will choose their coach.

Colour key

Episode 1 (19 January)
The series premiered on 19 January in Top Channel.

Episode 2 (26 January)
The second episode aired on 26 January in Top Channel.

Episode 3 (2 February)
The third episode aired on 2 February in Top Channel.

Episode 4 (9 February)
The fourth episode aired on 9 February in Top Channel.

Episode 5 (16 February)
The fifth episode aired on 16 February in Top Channel.

Episode 6 (23 February)
The sixth episode aired on 23 February in Top Channel.

Battle Rounds
Filming for the battles began in February 2018 at studio of Top Channel in Tirana, following the taping of the Blind Auditions.

Three artists from each team compete against by singing the same song. The coach of the three acts decides which one will go through and which two will be eliminated meaning that six acts from each team will get through the live shows.

Colour key

Live Shows
The live shows took place in the studio of Top Channel in Tirana, following the taping of the Blind Auditions and Battle Rounds. Each coach has advanced to the Live Shows six acts in her/their team. Each coach has advanced to the Semi-Final two acts in her/their team and the Public's votes two acts in each team. The Public's votes has advanced to the Final two acts in each team.

Color key

Week 1 (March 23) 
The first live show aired on March 23, 2018 in Top Channel. All artists from Team Eneda sang in the first live. The artists performed a solo song and a duet with another artist from Team Eneda.
 Theme: Music of Albania (Muzika Shqiptare)
 Opening: Team Eneda ("Ika larg")

Week 2 (March 30) 
The second live show aired on March 30, 2018 in Top Channel. All artists from Team Gjoka sang in the second live. The artists performed a solo song and a duet with another artist from Team Gjoka.
 Theme: Rock and roll
 Opening: Team Gjoka ("Kjo natë sa një jetë")

Week 3 (April 6) 
The third live show aired on April 6, 2018 in Top Channel. All artists from Team Miriam sang in the third live. The artists performed a solo song and a duet with another artist from Team Miriam.
 Theme: Disney
 Opening: Team Miriam ("Dhurata")

Week 4: Semi - Final (April 13) 
The Semi-Final aired on April 13, 2018 in  Top Channel. Each coach has four acts in her/their team.

Week 5: Final (April 20) 
The Final aired on April 20, 2018 in Top Channel. Each coach has two acts in her/their team.
 Opening: Finalist's, Coaches and Vocal Coaches ("I Like to Move It"/"I'm a Believer"/"Get Down")

Round 1

Round 2

Elimination chart

Overall
Color key 
Artist's info

Result details

Team
Color key 
Artist's info

Result details

References

External links 

Kids 2
2018 Albanian television seasons